Events from the year 1894 in Denmark.

Incumbents
 Monarch – Christian IX
 Prime minister – J. B. S. Estrup (until 7 August), Tage Reedtz-Thott

Events
 1 January  Gudhjem Time is introduced in Denmark.
 19 May – Danish Authors' Society is founded in Copenhagen.
 28 July
The foundation stone is laid for the new Copenhagen City Hall. It is not completed until 1905.
 The Stork Fountain at Amagertorv  in Copenhagen is inaugurated.
 19 August – Frederick's Church to its final design by Ferdinald Meldahl, almost 25+ years after its construction was first started by Nicolai Eigtved.
 9 November  The Freeport of Copenhagen opens to traffic. The same does a railway between the port and Nørrebro.

Undated
 The first electric elevator for human transportation in Denmark is installed in Magasin du Nord. A hydraulic elevator has been in operation at Hotel Kongen af Danmark since the 1870s.

Culture

Music

 14 March  The The première of Carl Nielsen's Symphony No. 1 is performed by Johan Svendsen conducting theRoyal Danish Orchestra, with Nielsen himself among the second violins.

Sports
 1 September Østerbros Boldklub is founded.

Births
 1 May – Carl Petersen, politician (died 1984)
 2 May – Ellen Gottschalch, actress (died 1981)
 10 July – Knud Heglund, actor (died 1960)
 14 July – Osvald Helmuth, actor and singer (died 1966)
 9 September – Poul Henningsen, writer, architect and designer (died 1967)

Deaths
 7 July – Adolph Hannover, physician (born 1814)

References

 
1890s in Denmark
Denmark
Years of the 19th century in Denmark